Abelard and Heloise is a soundtrack album released in 1970 by the Third Ear Band. It was re-released on CD in 1999 by Blueprint.

Track listing
All tracks were released without titles.

 Untitled – 13:42
 Untitled – 4:39
 Untitled – 3:21
 Untitled – 3:18
 Untitled – 4:12
 Untitled – 7:42

Personnel
 Glenn Sweeney — drums
 Paul Minns — oboe
 Richard Coff — violin, viola
 Ursula Smith — cello

Third Ear Band albums
1970 soundtrack albums
Harvest Records soundtracks